Hoctún Municipality (in the Yucatec Maya Language: “where the stone is quarried or ripped”) is one of the 106 municipalities in the Mexican state of Yucatán containing  (123.91 km2) of land and located roughly 45 km east of the city of Mérida.

History
There are no records indicating the history of pre-Hispanic times for this area. After the conquest the area became part of the encomienda system. Doña Angela de la Fleguera Castillo was the encomendera in 1722 and was in charge of 269 native inhabitants.

Yucatán declared its independence from the Spanish Crown in 1821 and in 1825, the area was assigned to the Beneficios Bajos region with its headquarters in Sotuta. In 1889, Hoctún acquired the category of Villa.

Governance
The municipal president is elected for a three-year term. The town council has seven aldermen, who serve as Secretary of the Town Hall; and councilors of markets, public lighting, potable water, parks and gardens, ecology and cemeteries.

The Municipal Council administers the business of the municipality. It is responsible for budgeting and expenditures and producing all required reports for all branches of the municipal administration. Annually it determines educational standards for schools.

The Police Commissioners ensure public order and safety. They are tasked with enforcing regulations, distributing materials and administering rulings of general compliance issued by the council.

Communities
The head of the municipality is Hoctún, Yucatán. The other populated areas in the municipality are Dziuché, Hacienda Petenchi Pich, San Antonio Cholul, San Isidro Ochil, San José Oriente, San José Poniente, San Isidro Ochil, San Miguel, and San Nicolás. The significant populations are shown below:

Local festivals
Every year from 15 to 31 May 31 a festival in honor of the Virgin of the Immaculate Conception is held; from 15 July to 6 August a celebration for the Holy Christ of the Transfiguration is held; and from the 25 to 29 September a festival honors St. Michael the Archangel.

Notables
Domingo María Moguel, (1848-1932) music teacher who taught at the Liceo de Merida and directed the orchestra.
Graciano Ricalde Gamboa, (1873-1942) mathematician

Tourist attractions
 Church of St. Michael the Archangel, built in the colonial era
 Church of San Lorenzo, built in the eighteenth century
 archaeological site at Holactún
 Hacienda Dziuché
 Hacienda San José Poniente is a Bed and Breakfast that is located in Hoctun.

References

Municipalities of Yucatán